Savage Dam is a dam across the Otay River in the San Ysidro Mountains of southwestern San Diego County, California. The dam is named in honor of H. N. Savage, who directed its construction.

The dam was originally completed in 1897 as an earthfill and steel structure called the Otay Dam by the Southern California Mountain Water Company to provide water storage. However, in 1916, heavy rains supposedly brought on by Charles Hatfield, a "rainmaker", hired by the city of San Diego to put an end to a drought, caused the dam to burst. Eleven Japanese American farmers were killed. The dam was rebuilt as Savage Dam in 1918, and has functioned properly since.

See also
List of reservoirs and dams in California
Otay County Open Space Preserve

References

External links
cbs8.com; "WWII bomber brought to surface of lower Otay Reservoir"

Dams in California
Arch-gravity dams
San Ysidro Mountains
United States local public utility dams
Buildings and structures in San Diego County, California
Dams completed in 1918